The 1893 VAMC football team represented Virginia Agricultural and Mechanical College in the 1893 college football season. The team was led by their head coach E. A. Smyth and finished with a record of zero wins and two losses (0–2).

Schedule

Players
The following players were members of the 1893 football team according to the roster published in the 1903 edition of The Bugle, the Virginia Tech yearbook. The roster is also found in the Virginia Tech University Archives.

Season summary

Emory and Henry
On October 21, 1893, VAMC played football against Emory and Henry College in Emory, Virginia. VAMC lost 0–6 due to captain H. B. Wills "making a mistake of trying for a sensational field goal when we were gaining ten and twenty yards at every down and were within a few yards of the goal."

Randolph–Macon Academy
The second and final game of the season was against Randolph-Macon Academy in Bedford, Virginia on November 18, 1893. VAMC lost 6–34. However, two newspaper articles from the time list the score as 6–38, and 6–35.

References

VAMC
Virginia Tech Hokies football seasons
College football winless seasons
VAMC football